Two Way Street is a 1930 British drama film directed by George King and starring Sari Maritza as Jill Whistler.

1930 films
British black-and-white films
British crime drama films
British historical films
1930s British films